These are the Australian Country number-one albums of 2003, per the ARIA Charts.

See also
2003 in music
List of number-one albums of 2003 (Australia)

References

Lists of number-one country albums in Australia
Count
Australia country albums